UTC+14:00 is an identifier for a time offset from UTC of +14:00. This is the earliest time zone on Earth, meaning that areas in this zone are the first to see a new day, and therefore the first to celebrate a New Year. It is also referred to as the "latest time zone" on Earth, as clocks in it always show the 'latest' (i.e., most advanced) time of all time zones.

UTC+14:00 stretches as far as 30° east of the 180° longitude line and creates a large fold in the International Date Line around the Pacific nation of Kiribati.

As standard time (year-round)

Principal settlement: Kiritimati

Oceania
Kiribati
Line Islands

History
Before this, the time zones UTC+13:00 and UTC+14:00 did not exist. As a British colony, Kiribati was centred in the Gilbert Islands, just west of the old date line. The distant Phoenix and Line Islands were on the other side of the date line. Government offices on opposite sides of the line could only communicate by radio or telephone on the four days of the week when both sides experienced weekdays simultaneously.

The revision of Kiribati's time zone meant that the date line in effect moved eastwards to go around this country, so that the Line Islands, including the inhabited Kiritimati island, started the year 2000 on its territory before any other country on Earth, a feature the Kiribati government capitalized on as a potential tourist draw.

Tonga—IANA time zone database zone name Pacific/Tongatapu—used UTC+14:00 for daylight saving time from 1999 to 2002 and 2016 to 2017, and therefore celebrated new year 2000 at the same time as the Line Islands in Kiribati.

Alaska had local times corresponding to between UTC+11:30 and UTC+15:10 until 1867 (24 hours were deducted in 1867 to make the date correspond to rest of United States). These times were local mean times and not time zones.

UTC+14:00 was used as a daylight time before 1982 in the parts of very eastern Russia (Chukotka) that used Anadyr Time.

See also 
Time in Alaska
Time in Russia
UTC−10:00, which is exactly one day behind UTC+14:00.
UTC−12:00, the last time zone to start a new day

References

External links
Find cities currently in UTC+14

UTC offsets